German Alexeevich Tatarinov (September 26, 1925 – August 3, 2006) – Soviet, Russian painter, Honored Artist of Russian Federation, lived and worked in Leningrad, regarded as one of representatives of the Leningrad school of painting, most famous for his landscape paintings.

Biography 
German Alexeevich Tatarinov was born September 26, 1925, in Old Crosses village, Yaroslavl Province, into a peasant family. In 1930 the family moved to a permanent place of residence in the town of Myshkin, now the Yaroslavl Province.

In 1942, German Tatarinov was drafted into the Red Army, took part in the battles of Stalingrad and the Soviet Far East against Japan.

Since 1949 German Tatarinov lived and worked in Leningrad.

In 1952, German Tatarinov graduated from the Leningrad Naval Political School named after Andrey Zhdanov. In 1953 he enrolled in the correspondence department of the Moscow Polygraphic Institute, which he graduated in 1961, the studio of Gennady Epifanov.

In 1961, German Tatarinov of Discharged from military service and went to work as an artist in a Leningrad department of Art Fund of Russian Federation.

Since 1967 German Tatarinov has participated in Art Exhibitions. Painted landscapes, still lifes, genre compositions. Solo Exhibitions by German Tatarinov were in Leningrad (1975) and Myshkin(1999).

German Tatarinov mostly worked as landscape painter. The color works restrained, based on the relationship of green and ocher tones. Composition and style gravitated toward plain air painting and full-scale panoramic subjects with a wide coverage area, with a consistently readable plans, while maintaining the constructive role of the figure.

German Tatarinov was a Member of the Saint Petersburg Union of Artists (before 1992 – Leningrad branch of Union of Artists of Russian Federation) since 1972, a Member of Peter's Academy of Sciences and Arts (1995).

In 2000, German Tatarinov was awarded the honorary title of Honored Artist of Russian Federation.

German Alexeevich Tatarinov died in Saint Petersburg in 2006. Paintings by German Tatarinov are in Art museums and private collections in Russia, France, USA, Finland, Germany, England, Japan, and throughout the world.

Honours and awards 
 Honoured Artist of the RSFSR
 Order of the Red Star
 Medal "For the Victory over Japan"
 Medal "For the Victory over Germany in the Great Patriotic War 1941–1945"

See also 
 List of painters of Saint Petersburg Union of Artists
 List of the Russian Landscape painters

References

Bibliography 
 Matthew C. Bown. Dictionary of 20th Century Russian and Soviet Painters 1900-1980s. - London: Izomar, 1998. , .
 Sergei V. Ivanov. Unknown Socialist Realism. The Leningrad School. – Saint Petersburg: NP-Print Edition, 2007. – pp. 254, 277, 370, 394, 396, 397, 400, 402, 403, 405, 406, 444. , .
 Artists of Peter's Academy of Arts and Sciences. - Saint Petersburg: Ladoga Edition, 2008. - pp. 176–177.

External links 

 Exhibition of German Tatarinov in ARKA Fine Art Gallery

1925 births
2006 deaths
People from Yaroslavl Oblast
Soviet military personnel of World War II
20th-century Russian painters
Russian male painters
21st-century Russian painters
Soviet painters
Socialist realist artists
Leningrad School artists
Members of the Leningrad Union of Artists
Painters from Saint Petersburg
Russian landscape painters
Honored Artists of the Russian Federation
20th-century Russian male artists
21st-century Russian male artists